The National Petroleum Council (Conselho Nacional do Petróleo or CNP) is a Brazilian organization that was established in 1938 to "supervise, regulate, and carry out the oil industry activities previously executed by the SFPM (de Oliveira, 2012) The SFPM (Service for Promotion of Mineral Production, according to de Oliveira) was a previous governmental organization established to encourage the search and production of minerals and oil but proved to fail. The CNP was headed by General Horta Barbosa and its first mission was to find oil in Bahia.

References 

Petroleum in Brazil
1938 establishments in Brazil
1960 disestablishments in Brazil
Defunct government agencies
Government agencies of Brazil
Government agencies established in 1938
Government agencies disestablished in 1960
Defunct organisations based in Brazil
Vargas Era